Gümüşsu (literally "silver water") is a Turkish place name that may refer to the following places in Turkey:

 Gümüşsu, Bayburt, a village in the district of Bayburt, Bayburt Province
 Gümüşsu, Çivril
 Gümüşsu, Simav, a town in the district of Simav, Kütahya Province

See also
 Gümüş (disambiguation), "silver"